The men's halfpipe competition of the FIS Snowboarding World Championships 2011 was held at Alabaus in La Molina, Spain between January 19 and 20, 2011. 55 athletes from 18 countries competed. 
The qualification round was completed on January 19, while the final was completed on January 20.

Results

Qualification

Heat 1

Heat 2

Heat 3

Semifinal

Final

References

Halfpipe, men's